Gastón Filgueira Méndez (born 8 January 1986, in Montevideo) is a Uruguayan football player who plays for C.A. Cerro.

International career
Filgueira made his Uruguay debut against Venezuela in 2006. He was recalled to the team for a match against Australia, on 2 June 2007.

Titles

Nacional
 Primera División Uruguaya: 2008–09

Arsenal
 2007 Copa Sudamericana

Fortaleza
 2017 Copa de campeones cearense

References

External links
 
 

1986 births
Living people
Uruguayan footballers
Uruguayan expatriate footballers
Uruguay international footballers
Association football fullbacks
Footballers from Montevideo
C.A. Cerro players
Central Español players
Club Nacional de Football players
Arsenal de Sarandí footballers
Club Deportivo Palestino footballers
Liverpool F.C. (Montevideo) players
Clube Náutico Capibaribe players
Chilean Primera División players
Argentine Primera División players
Uruguayan expatriate sportspeople in Chile
Uruguayan expatriate sportspeople in Argentina
Uruguayan expatriate sportspeople in Brazil
Expatriate footballers in Chile
Expatriate footballers in Argentina
Expatriate footballers in Brazil